膾 may refer to:

 Kuai (dish), a Chinese dish
 Namasu, a Japanese dish
 Hoe (dish), a Korean dish